"Common Man" is a song written by Sammy Johns and originally recorded by him in 1981 via Elektra Records. Johns's version charted at number 50 on Hot Country Songs in 1981. It had "Easy to Be with You" on the B-side, and was produced by James Stroud and Tom Long.

It was later recorded by American country music artist John Conlee.  It was released in February 1983 as the fourth single from his album Busted.  The song was Conlee's third number one on the country chart, and his first number one since 'Backside of Thirty" in 1979.  The single stayed at number one for one week.

Chart performance

Sammy Johns

John Conlee

Year-end charts

References

1981 singles
1983 singles
1981 songs
John Conlee songs
Sammy Johns songs
Elektra Records singles
MCA Records singles
Songs written by Sammy Johns
Song recordings produced by James Stroud